Pajamäen Pallo-Veiko (abbreviated PPV) is a Helsinki-based football club centred on Pajamäki. The club was formed in 1969 and has a catchment covering the western Helsinki area. From the outset the development of junior football has been an important part of club activities. In the first decade of the new millennium the number of junior players has increased by over a hundred and there have been similar advancements at the adult level.

PPV are one of Helsinki's longest-running lower division clubs.  For almost 40 years the PPV first team has been playing at the Kolmonen level and has experienced neither relegation or promotion.  Their home ground is at the Talin urheilupuisto (Tali sports park).

Season to season

Junior Development

This small club has developed a large number of junior teams and has seen significant success at the National Youth League championships level and in the Helsinki Cup.  The future looks good for the development of junior teams for the younger age groups.  A key objective of the club is to produce talented players from the club's own senior teams and provide a good starting point for youngsters to develop and make progress at a higher level.

2011 season

For the current season PPV are competing in Section 2 (Lohko 2) of the Kolmonen administered by the Helsinki SPL and Uusimaa SPL. This is the fourth highest tier in the Finnish football system.

PPV have two teams playing at the Vitonen level with PPV/2 participating in Section 3 (Lohko 3) and PPV/Seos in Section 1 (Lohko 1) administered by the Helsinki SPL.

References and sources
Official Website
Finnish Wikipedia
Suomen Cup
PPV Facebook

Football clubs in Helsinki
Association football clubs established in 1969
1969 establishments in Finland